Gabriel Daniel Viloria Norwood (born February 9, 1985) is a Filipino-American professional basketball player for the Rain or Shine Elasto Painters of the Philippine Basketball Association (PBA). He played college basketball at George Mason University. He has been a member of the Philippine national basketball team.

High school and college career
Norwood spent his life in many different parts of the United States while his father, Brian Norwood, now defensive coordinator at UCLA, coached different collegiate football teams. In high school, he and his brother (Jordan Norwood, a former football player at Penn State where his father coached until 2007) were part of the state championship team at State College Area High School in State College, Pennsylvania.

Norwood was part of the 2005–06 George Mason Patriots men's basketball team as their sixth man. He played 35 games averaging 3.5 points per game, 2.1 rebounds per game, 2.0 assists per game, 1.0 steals per game, 42.5 FG%, 58.8FT% in 21.1 mins/game.

Professional career

Rain or Shine Elasto Painters (2008–present)
Norwood was the first overall pick in the 2008 PBA Draft by the Rain or Shine Elasto Painters. During the 2009 PBA All-Star Week, Norwood won in the Slam Dunk Contest among locals. He failed to beat the 2006 NCAA Slam Dunk Champion and Barangay Ginebra Kings import, David Noel, who won the same contest but among the imports. He won the 2008–09 PBA Rookie of the Year Award  for his promising performance inside the court. He was also named into the Second Mythical Team. 

In the 2010 All-Star Game in Puerto Princesa, Norwood won the Handy Fix All-Star Game MVP for his highlight dunks and moves and also because of his baskets in the critical moments of the game. He had 17 points, 5 rebounds, 4 assists, 2 steals, and a block. He led the North All-Stars to a 133–130 win over the South All-Stars. He finished that season as a member of the All-Defensive Team, and became Defensive Player of the Year.

In 2011, he agreed to an P8.4 million two-year contract-extension deal. The following year, he won his first championship during the Governors' Cup.

In Game 3 of the 2012-13 Philippine Cup quarterfinals, Norwood stepped up with 21 points and 6 assists to eliminate Ginebra and move on to the semis. They made it all the way to the Finals, where they lost to the Talk 'N Text Tropang Texters. The next conference, which was the Commissioner's Cup, Rain or Shine went on a 5-game winning streak, but it was snapped by Talk 'N Text, which was their sixth straight loss to that team. They lost to Ginebra in the quarterfinals that conference. In the quarterfinals against the Globalport Batang Pier in the Governors' Cup, he hit a corner three with 17.8 seconds left that eventually sent Rain or Shine to the semifinals. In the semis, Rain or Shine lost to the Petron Blaze Boosters. He finished his season a member of the All-Defensive Team.

In their matchup against the Barako Bull Energy in the 2013-14 Philippine Cup, Norwood stole a pass for Mick Pennisi and made two free throws to seal the win for Rain or Shine. They made it to the Finals that year, along with the San Mig Super Coffee Mixers. In Game 1, he made an alley-oop pass to Paul Lee with 0.9 seconds remaining that gave Rain or Shine the lead. Lee then sealed the win with a technical free throw when San Mig sued for time without any timeouts left. San Mig eventually won the series in the next five games. They rematched again in the Governors' Cup Finals. But it was the same result, as San Mig won the series, capturing the first Grand Slam since the Alaska Aces did it in 1996. 

Once again Rain Or Shine made another finals stint in the 2015 Commissioner's Cup going up against Talk 'N Text but they failed to secure the championship on their belt after a competitive second overtime in Game 7. TNT was led by Jayson Castro who was named the Best Player of the Conference and Ranidel de Ocampo who was named the Finals MVP.

Norwood won his second title during the 2016 Commissioner's Cup. On October 14, 2016, he was recognized during the PBA Leo Awards Night as he was named to the All-Defensive Team. He also re-signed with the team for two more years.

Norwood missed some time the next season due to a viral infection. Unfortunately, they were not able to defend their Commissioner's Cup title. In his first game of the Governors' Cup after playing for the national team in the 2017 FIBA Asia Cup, he had 15 points and 11 rebounds while playing 37 minutes in a win against the Star Hotshots. Several weeks later, he scored 17 points in a win against the Phoenix Fuel Masters. Rain or Shine was eliminated in the quarterfinals by the San Miguel Beermen. He was given the Sportsmanship Award and was on the All-Defensive Team.

In 2018, Norwood was once again on the All-Defensive Team, which was his sixth straight inclusion.

In 2021, Norwood made three of his four three-point attempts as he finished with 15 points that helped Rain or Shine beat the Terrafirma Dyip. Norwood and his team didn't have a very successful season, as Rain or Shine was eliminated in the quarterfinals of the Philippine Cup by Magnolia, and didn't make the playoffs of the Governors' Cup.

National team career
Norwood was a member of the national basketball team of the Philippines that represented the country in the 2007 William Jones Cup, and in the FIBA Asia Championship 2007.

In 2008, Norwood was again named to the Philippine Training Pool headed by Coach Yeng Guiao for future international competitions. He saw action and his team finished 8th overall in the 2009 FIBA Asia Championship held in Tianjin, China on August 6–16, 2009.

Norwood once again joined the national team in 2013, this time under the second incarnation of the Smart-Gilas program. His athleticism and versatility on both sides of the floor was a great asset in the team's run to a silver medal finish in the FIBA Asia Men's Championship, hosted in the Philippines.

Norwood rejoined the national team for the 2014 FIBA Basketball World Cup in Spain. He went viral during the tournament for his dunk over Argentinian NBA player Luis Scola. In 2020, it was one of 32 dunks nominated by FIBA for its Dunk of the Decade.

He was also included in the final 12 during the 2015 FIBA Asia Championship wherein they took the second place after losing to China in the finals game. He also took part in the Olympics Qualifying Tournament, losing both games to France and New Zealand in the preliminary round and failing to advance in the knockout-round.

Norwood also played in 2017 FIBA Asia Cup in Lebanon and was the team captain for the 2019 FIBA World Cup Asian Qualifiers and World Cup.

Player profile 
Norwood is known as an athletic wing who is a playmaker and great defender. Chot Reyes, the national team coach, saw Norwood as "...an athletic player and a tall utility man. The 6’5”/6'6" guard we never had, who could guard the opponent’s best wingman, be a playmaker and fastbreak finisher”. He is also known for his energy and hustle.

He is also known for being committed to the national team and for only staying with Rain or Shine for his whole professional career.

Personal life
Gabe is the brother of former Denver Broncos wide receiver Jordan Norwood. He has two other brothers: Levi and Zach, and one sister. His father is Brian Norwood, former co-defensive coordinator and safeties coach with the Navy Midshipmen football. He is also the cousin of Alohi Robins-Hardy, a professional volleyball player who plays in the PSL and member of the Philippines women's national volleyball team.

Gabe and his wife Lei were married in 2013. They have three sons: Cassius, Orion, and Idris.

Norwood is also friends with multiple Fil-Am basketball players, including former teammate Sol Mercado, Chris Ross, Joe Devance, and NBA player Jordan Clarkson.

Norwood is often called 'Mr. President' because of his striking resemblance to former US president Barack Obama and his leadership skills.

In 2019, Norwood, with the help of a Japanese company, created his own manga, Cager Clash. He also has a restaurant, the Naxional South American Diner, and an online food delivery service.

Norwood is also a columnist for the Philippine edition of NBA.com.

Career statistics

PBA

As of the end of 2022–23 season

Season-by-season averages 

|-
| align=left | 
| align=left | Rain or Shine
| 44 || 36.4 || .394 || .269 || .583 || 8.0 || 3.5 || 1.2 || .6 || 11.5
|-
| align=left | 
| align=left | Rain or Shine
| 51 || 38.6 || .422 || .287 || .727 || 6.7 || 3.8 || 1.4 || .7 || 13.8
|-
| align=left | 
| align=left | Rain or Shine
| 40 || 32.3 || .371 || .336 || .669 || 6.3 || 3.8 || 1.3 || .6 || 10.2
|-
| align=left | 
| align=left | Rain or Shine
| 53 || 29.6 || .396 || .294 || .644 || 6.1 || 3.3 || .9 || .5 || 8.7
|-
| align=left | 
| align=left | Rain or Shine
| 56 || 27.8 || .357 || .215 || .635 || 5.3 || 2.8 || 1.1 || .6 || 7.4
|-
| align=left | 
| align=left | Rain or Shine
| 58 || 26.4 || .387 || .213 || .643 || 4.3 || 2.5 || 1.0 || .4 || 7.8
|-
| align=left | 
| align=left | Rain or Shine
| 53 || 26.6 || .374 || .323 || .509 || 4.0 || 2.1 || 1.0 || .3 || 7.4 
|-
| align=left | 
| align=left | Rain or Shine
| 54 || 24.1 || .394 || .327 || .727 || 4.4 || 1.8 || 1.0 || .3 || 7.2
|-
| align=left | 
| align=left | Rain or Shine
| 36 || 28.5 || .395 || .273 || .716 || 5.6 || 2.2 || 1.4 || .4 || 8.0
|-
| align=left | 
| align=left | Rain or Shine
| 40 || 30.5 || .348 || .253 || .543 || 6.3 || 2.8 || 1.4 || .3 || 8.2
|-
| align=left | 
| align=left | Rain or Shine
| 48 || 29.2 || .335 || .267 || .633 || 4.9 || 2.2 || 1.3 || .5 || 6.6
|-
| align=left | 
| align=left | Rain or Shine
| 12 || 31.1 || .256 || .119 || .917 || 5.8 || 1.8 || 1.5 || 1.0 || 4.8
|-
| align=left | 
| align=left | Rain or Shine
| 24 || 29.8 || .325 || .213 || .611 || 4.9 || 2.8 || .9 || .5 || 4.3
|-
| align=left | 
| align=left | Rain or Shine
| 30 || 22.9 || .357 || .289 || .533 || 3.0 || 2.4 || .9 || .1 || 4.9
|-class=sortbottom
| align=center colspan=2 | Career
| 599 || 29.5 || .377 || .273 || .646 || 5.4 || 2.7 || 1.1 || .5 || 8.3

National team

|-
| align="left" | 2007 FIBA Asia Championship
| align="left" rowspan="8" | 
| 7 || 23.0 || .488 || .250 || .810 || 4.7 || 1.7 || 1.1 || 0.4 || 8.3 
|-
| align="left" | 2009 FIBA Asia Championship
| 9 || 16.0 || .400 || .333 || .524 || 2.6 || 1.2 || 1.3 || 0.2 || 6.2
|-
| align="left" | 2012 William Jones Cup
| 8 || 26.8 || .397 || .571 || .722 || 5.1 || 2.8 || 0.5 || 0.5 || 9.9
|-
| align="left" | 2012 FIBA Asia Cup
| 7 || 25.2|| .458 || .167 || .400 || 5.0 || 0.9 || 1.0 || 0.3 || 7.1
|-
| align="left" | 2013 FIBA Asia Championship
| 9 || 27.0 || .474 || .375 || .591 || 4.0 || 1.7 || 0.8 || 1.0 || 6.1
|-
| align="left" | 2014 FIBA World Cup
| 5 || 31.8 || .344 || .133 || .500 || 3.0 || 1.0 || 1.0 || 0.2 || 5.2
|-
| align="left" | 2015 FIBA Asia Championship
| 9 || 25.6 || .324 || .211 || .500 || 3.7 || 1.3 || 1.6 || 0.8 || 3.4
|-
| align="left" | 2017 FIBA Asia Cup
| 6 || 26.8 || .423 || .333 || .667 || 4.7 || 2.8 || 1.5 || 1.2 || 5.0
|-

NCAA

|-
| align="left" | 2003–04
| align="left" rowspan="4" | George Mason University
| 29 || 1 || 8.4 || .306 || .308 || .500 || .8 || .7 || .3 || .1 || 1.0
|-
| align="left" | 2004–05
| 29 || 24 ||26.3 || .438 || .133 || .672 || 3.6 || 2.5 || 1.6 || .5 || 5.6
|-
| align="left" | 2005–06
| 35 || 3 || 21.1 || .425 || .375 || .588 || 2.1 || 2.0 || 1.0 || .7 || 3.5
|-
| align="left" | 2006–07
| 33 || 9 || 18.7 || .465 || .382 || .706 || 2.3 || 1.9 || .8 || .2 || 3.9

References

External links
 Profile of Norwood
 Norwood on the Hard Court
 ESPN Player Profile
 Jones Cup Player Profile

1985 births
Living people
American sportspeople of Filipino descent
Basketball players at the 2014 Asian Games
Basketball players from North Carolina
Citizens of the Philippines through descent
George Mason Patriots men's basketball players
Philippine Basketball Association All-Stars
Philippines men's national basketball team players
Filipino men's basketball players
Rain or Shine Elasto Painters players
Shooting guards
Small forwards
Southeast Asian Games gold medalists for the Philippines
Southeast Asian Games competitors for the Philippines
Southeast Asian Games medalists in basketball
Basketball players at the 2018 Asian Games
2014 FIBA Basketball World Cup players
American men's basketball players
Competitors at the 2007 Southeast Asian Games
Asian Games competitors for the Philippines
2019 FIBA Basketball World Cup players
Rain or Shine Elasto Painters draft picks